Mark David Aldred (born 18 April 1987) is a British rower who competed at the 2016 Summer Olympics in Rio.

Personal life 
Aldred learned to row during his time at Downing College, Cambridge. He then worked as a patent attorney, before joining the British rowing team full-time.

Rowing career
Aldred won bronze at the 2013 World Rowing Championships in Chungju, as part of the lightweight coxless pair with Sam Scrimgeour. The following year he competed at the 2014 World Rowing Championships in Bosbaan, Amsterdam, where he won another bronze medal as part of the lightweight coxless four with Peter Chambers, Richard Chambers and Chris Bartley.

Two years later he was selected for the British Olympic team and competed in the men's lightweight coxless four event with Chris Bartley, Jono Clegg and Peter Chambers, finishing in seventh place.

References

1987 births
Living people
British male rowers
Rowers at the 2016 Summer Olympics
Olympic rowers of Great Britain
World Rowing Championships medalists for Great Britain
European Rowing Championships medalists